Maria McLean is a former competitive figure skater from Great Britain. She is the 1973 British national champion. McLean competed at three European Championships, placing as high as sixth (1974), and at two World Championships, placing 11th in 1973 and 12th in 1974.

McLean is an ISU technical specialist. She is also a choreographer who has worked with Laura Lepistö, Jelena Glebova, and Jenni Vähämaa.

Competitive highlights

References 

British female single skaters
Scottish female single skaters
Figure skating choreographers
International Skating Union technical specialists
Sportspeople from Edinburgh
Living people
Year of birth missing (living people)